"Dieses Leben" is a song by German band Juli. It was written by band members Jonas Pfetzing, Simon Triebel, Eva Briegel, and Andreas Herde for their second album Ein neuer Tag (2006), while production was overseen by O.L.A.F. Opal.

Formats and track listings

Charts

Weekly charts

Year-end charts

References

2006 singles
Juli (band) songs
Songs written by Eva Briegel
2006 songs
Songs written by Simon Triebel
German-language songs